Mora Station is a station on the Busan Metro Line 2 in Mora-dong, Sasang District, Busan, South Korea.
Not to be confused with Moran in Seoul.

External links

  Cyber station information from Busan Transportation Corporation

Busan Metro stations
Sasang District
Railway stations in South Korea opened in 1999